Ritamarie Goulet (nee Thomason) (born August 25, 1983) is an American professional auto racing driver and police sergeant. She competes part-time in the ARCA Menards Series, driving the No. 31 Toyota Camry for Rise Motorsports, and currently serves as a police officer for the Gastonia Police Department in North Carolina. She was previously employed as a police sergeant for the Tuscaloosa Police Department in Alabama.

Early life 
Thomason was born on August 25, 1983, in Pawtucket, Rhode Island, to a poor family. Thomason eventually settled in Alaska when she was 11. Her parents got divorced when she was 15. She was kicked out of her house, and was moved into a homeless shelter at the age of 16. During the events of 9/11, she continued to live in a homeless shelter, and worked part-time at a tourist attraction in Anchorage. After seeing the attack unfold in a little break room TV, she was desired to help others in difficult situations, which gave her the courage to train as a paramedic. She was transferred into a vocational school to train as a medical assistant. She was later offered an opportunity to finish her paramedic training in Tuscaloosa, Alabama, for which she accepted.

Law enforcement career 
After working as a paramedic for five years, Thomason began working as a police sergeant for the Tuscaloosa Police Department in 2011. She states that her persistent desire to help others led to a law enforcement career. She also works as a school resource officer on Monday mornings, a security guard for an apartment complex on Monday and Tuesday nights, and provides security for a local hospital on Thursday nights. During the weekends, she works at a game-style bowling alley.

After moving to Denver, North Carolina in late 2022 with her husband, she began working as an officer for the Gastonia Police Department.

Racing career

Early career 
Thomason's interest for racing came at 11-years old, after her family purchased their first car, a 1983 Subaru wagon. She explained that the car "was more rust than car at this point." She began to drive at the age of 23, and purchased a 1992 Mazda Miata. She officially started racing in 2018, at 33-years old, driving in an autocross event. She found out that amateur club racing was something that she wanted to do, so she began to strip off the interior of her Miata, and make it into a race car. She started driving competitively in the SCCA in 2019, racing mostly on road courses. She received her racing license at the end of the season in November. In 2020, she began racing in the ChampCar Endurance Series, along with the 24 Hours of Lemons. That same year, she would earn a couple of wins in the SCCA. After watching old NASCAR races, she wanted to go stock car racing. In 2021, she sold her Miata, along with her trailer, and purchased a 2014 Chevrolet SS stock car. She had her car tuned up by Dick and Bob Rahilly, the owners of RahMoc Enterprises.

ARCA Menards Series 
During the fall of 2021, Thomason tested her stock car at local road courses. She would sign part-time with Clubb Racing Inc. in the 2022 ARCA Menards Series, where she plans to run two road courses, and 2-4 short tracks. She made her first start at Berlin Raceway, where she started 15th, and finished 12th.

Personal life 
Thomason met her first husband when she was 17, living at a homeless shelter at the time. They got married two years later. Thomason explains that she was sexually, physically, and financially abused by him. She also explains that he had control of what she did, and wouldn't allow her to drive, which eventually lead to a divorce. She moved to Alabama, to avoid contact with her ex-husband, and would later meet her second husband. They both married after the move, but got divorced soon after, as they realized they were better off as friends. She met her third husband a few years later, and sometime during 2022, they divorced. Thomason met NASCAR pit crew member Tim Goulet in early 2022, and realized that they both had the same goals of owning an ARCA Menards Series team in the near future. Rita and Tim married on January 1, 2023, and they currently reside in Denver, North Carolina, with a daughter and a son from Tim's previous marriage.

Motorsports career results

ARCA Menards Series
(key) (Bold – Pole position awarded by qualifying time. Italics – Pole position earned by points standings or practice time. * – Most laps led.)

ARCA Menards Series East

References

External links
 
 

Living people
1983 births
ARCA Menards Series drivers
Champ Car drivers
Women police officers
Racing drivers from Rhode Island
LGBT racing drivers
American LGBT sportspeople
LGBT people from Rhode Island
American female racing drivers